Clint Junior High School is a public school in Clint, Texas (United States). It is part of the Clint Independent School District.

History
Clint Junior High School is Located in Clint, Texas. The history of this school starts in the year 1886 as an adobe house for the purposes of giving church and school to the surrounding developing area of Clint, Texas. In the year 1901, the school house caught fire and was burned but a new school house was placed on the same site. The school house was then sold and construction of a new school building was to be made. During the year of 1918 the construction of a new school building took place. By the year 1921 the construction of the new school building was finished and served as a school for the developing area and as population grew new schools were created making the school building today known as the Clint Junior High School. The school  now serves grades 6 through 8 to all its students.
Clint Junior High School's mascot is the Cub.

Extracurricular activities

Student Council
Newspaper
Yearbook
JROTC
Speech and Debate
crime stoppers
Football
Basketball
Baseball
Tennis
Track & Field

References

External links

Clint ISD

Schools in El Paso County, Texas
Public middle schools in Texas